The Black Ace may refer to:

 The Black Ace (1928 film), an American silent western film
 The Black Ace (1944 film), a Mexican mystery film 
 Black Ace (1905–1972), stage name of the American Texas blues musician born Babe Kyro Lemon Turner